Jacques Haeko (born 23 April 1984) is a New Caledonian footballer who plays as a striker for AS Lössi in the New Caledonia Division Honneur.

International career
He has represented New Caledonia at the senior level. Most notably he was the top scorer in 2012 OFC Nations Cup where he scored 6 goals and was the best goal scorer in the tournament.

References

1983 births
Living people
New Caledonian footballers
New Caledonia international footballers
Association football forwards
AS Lössi players
2012 OFC Nations Cup players